John S. Matijevich (December 25, 1927 – November 3, 2016) was an American politician.

Matijevich was born in North Chicago, Illinois. He served in the United States Army. Matijevich received his bachelor's degree from Lake Forest College. He served as the police chief for the village of North Chicago and wrote columns for the North Chicago Tribune, the Lake County Journal, and for the Bob Schroeder Publishing Company. Matijevich served in the Illinois House of Representatives from 1967 to 1992 and was a Democrat. He died at his home in North Chicago, Illinois.

Notes

1927 births
2016 deaths
People from North Chicago, Illinois
Military personnel from Illinois
American police chiefs
Journalists from Illinois
Lake Forest College alumni
Democratic Party members of the Illinois House of Representatives
American people of Croatian descent